Elephant & Castle railway station is a National Rail station in Newington, south London. Along with the London Underground station of the same name, it is located in the London Borough of Southwark and is in both Travelcard Zone 1 and 2. The station is managed by Thameslink, with services operated by both Thameslink and Southeastern. There is out-of-station interchange with the nearby Elephant & Castle tube station.

Layout

The London, Chatham and Dover Railway built the station on a brick viaduct in 1863. It currently has one entrance on Elephant Road. There are four platforms, two being on the island between the lines. Four staircases provide the only access to the platforms, as there are no lifts or escalators.

The station is not directly connected to the London Underground station, both entrances to which are some distance away.

Services
Services from the National Rail station are operated by Thameslink and Southeastern.

The weekday off-peak service in trains per hour (tph) is:
Northbound
2tph to London Blackfriars
2tph to Kentish Town via Blackfriars
4tph to St Albans City via Blackfriars and Kentish Town
(A total of 8tph calling at Blackfriars and 6tph through the Thameslink core to Kentish Town)
Southbound
2tph to Sevenoaks
2tph to Orpington
2tph to Sutton via Mitcham Junction
2tph to Sutton via Wimbledon

The services between Kentish Town and Orpington run weekdays only.

At peak hours there are one or two extra Southeastern trains from or to other, more distant destinations, such as Ashford (Kent), Rochester, Orpington and Dover Priory.

Oyster Card Pay-as-you-go can be used at this station with all services up to Elstree & Borehamwood railway station.

Connections

Local bus connections are provided by bus stops at New Kent Road and Walworth Road. London Buses routes 1, 53, 63, 68,  168, 172, 188, 363, 415, 453,  N1 and  N63 stop near the station at New Kent Road. Routes 12, 35, 40, 45, 68, 136, 148, 171, 176, 343, 468, P5 and night routes N68, N89, N171 and N343 stop near the station at Walworth Road.

There is also a coach stop at New Kent Road; National Express coaches towards Kent stop near the station.

There is an out-of-station interchange facility with Elephant & Castle (London Underground) station.

Elephant and Castle redevelopment 
An entrance directly connected to the upper level of the Elephant and Castle Shopping Centre closed in September 2020, as part of the redevelopment of the area.

A new entrance to the railway station will be built, connecting to the new town centre. Existing railway arches will be opened up, providing access for pedestrians to Elephant Park. Interchange with the Underground will also improve, with a direct route through the new town centre to a new Underground ticket hall. However, local press have criticised the omission of step-free access to the National Rail platforms.

2021 fire

On 28 June 2021, a fire broke out under the station. The London Fire Brigade and sent 15 fire engines. The fire is thought to be accidental and believed to have been caused by an electrical fault within a car in a spray booth at T.R. Autos, a garage in the arches of the railway viaduct, then spread to the surrounding commercial units, six cars and a telephone box. Six people were treated for minor injuries at the scene and one person was taken to hospital.

The surface station was undamaged, but became engulfed in smoke. The station and railway line were closed, leading to the cancellation of several services. Some nearby residents were evacuated from their homes. Access to the underground tube station was restricted, with one entrance being briefly closed as a precaution. Many roads in the area were closed.

References

External links

Railway stations in the London Borough of Southwark
DfT Category E stations
Former London, Chatham and Dover Railway stations
Railway stations in Great Britain opened in 1862
Railway stations served by Govia Thameslink Railway
Railway stations served by Southeastern
1862 establishments in England
2021 fires in the United Kingdom
Fires in London